Finyl Vinyl is a collection of live recordings and B-sides by the British hard rock band Rainbow and was released in 1986, after the band had already disbanded in 1984. All the studio tracks had previously been released.

Notes
 The cover photograph of Ritchie Blackmore was taken by Ross Halfin after a concert at the Deutschlandhalle in Berlin in November 1982. The person all the way in the background is Don Airey running towards the stage trying to get in the shot. (as told by Don Airey himself in 2005)	
The LP notes mistakenly credit drums on "Weiss Heim" to Bobby Rondinelli, when in fact they were performed by Cozy Powell.
The instrumental "Difficult to Cure" is taken from the final Japanese Rainbow date in 1984 and features a full orchestral accompaniment. The guitar solo was re-recorded and differs from the video release.
The song "Man on the Silver Mountain" features guitar overdubs.
The song "Can't Happen Here" has wrong location and date in the booklet. It was actually recorded at "The Orpheum Theatre" in Boston, MA, USA on May 7, 1981.
The original double vinyl release omitted "Street of Dreams", although it was included on the cassette version before "Jealous Lover". The first CD issue, a single disc, omitted both "Street of Dreams" and "Tearin' Out My Heart". These were restored on the 2CD remastered edition of 1999, which features different lengths for several tracks along with the original artwork.

Track listing

Personnel
Guitar: Ritchie Blackmore
Vocals: Joe Lynn Turner (tracks 1-6, 10-11, 15), Graham Bonnet (tracks 7-8), Ronnie James Dio (tracks 12-13)
Bass: Roger Glover (all except tracks 12-13), Bob Daisley (tracks 12-13)
Drums: Chuck Burgi (tracks 1-3, 9, 15), Bobby Rondinelli (tracks 4-6, 10-11), Cozy Powell (tracks 7-8, 12-14)
Keyboards: David Rosenthal (tracks 1-3, 6, 9-11, 15), Don Airey (tracks 4-5, 7-8, 14), David Stone (tracks 12-13)
Backing vocals: Lynn Robinson (tracks 1-5, 8-9, 15) and Dee Beale (tracks 4-5, 10-11)

Charts

References

Rainbow (rock band) live albums
1986 live albums
Polydor Records live albums
Albums produced by Roger Glover
Mercury Records live albums